Philip Howard may refer to:

Philip Howard, 13th Earl of Arundel (1557–1595), English nobleman and saint
Philip Howard (1629–1717), English army officer and Member of Parliament
Philip Howard (died 1686) (c. 1631–1686), English soldier and politician
Philip Howard (1669–1711), English Member of Parliament for Morpeth and Carlisle
Philip Howard (cardinal) (1629–1694), English Roman Catholic cardinal
Philip Howard (journalist) (1933-2014), British journalist
Philip Howard (pianist) (born 1976), British pianist and composer
Philip Howard (Whig politician) (1801–1883), Member of Parliament for Carlisle 
Philip K. Howard (born 1948), American author and lawyer
Philip N. Howard, Canadian author and Oxford professor
Phil Howard (musician), Australian jazz drummer
Phil Howard (chef), British chef, chef patron, and restaurateur